Gloucestershire County Council in England is elected every four years. Following last boundary changes in 2005, 63 councillors were elected from 53 divisions. The last election took place on 2 May 2013, when all divisions were reduced to single members.

Political control
Since 1973 political control of the council has been held by the following parties:

Leadership
The leaders of the council since 2001 have been:

Council elections
1973 Gloucestershire County Council election
1977 Gloucestershire County Council election
1981 Gloucestershire County Council election
1985 Gloucestershire County Council election
1989 Gloucestershire County Council election
1993 Gloucestershire County Council election
2001 Gloucestershire County Council election
2005 Gloucestershire County Council election
2009 Gloucestershire County Council election
2013 Gloucestershire County Council election
2017 Gloucestershire County Council election
2021 Gloucestershire County Council election

County result maps

By-election results

1993-1997

1997-2001

2005-2009

References

By-election results

External links
Gloucestershire County Council

 
Council elections in Gloucestershire
Gloucestershire